Va'a-tele are large, traditional Samoan double canoe multihull watercraft.

See also
va'a

References

Canoes
Canoeing and kayaking equipment
Samoan culture